Brud Talbot (September 16, 1938 – November 20, 1986) was an American film actor, producer, director and writer.

He played George in Force of Impulse (1961), by Saul Swimmer. He appeared in Finger on the Trigger (1965) along Rory Calhoun and Todd Martin.

He was adapting along Ernest Greenberg the autobiography Where the Money Was, by Willie Sutton, into a film, and offered Dustin Hoffman the role, but he rejected it.

Filmography

References

External links
 

1938 births
1986 deaths
American male pornographic film actors
Film producers from New York (state)
Film directors from New York City
20th-century American male writers
Writers from New York City
20th-century American writers